Home with You may refer to:

 "Home with You", a 2018 song by Madison Beer from the EP As She Pleases
 "Home with You", a 2018 song by Liam Payne from the EP First Time
 "Home with You", a 2019 song by FKA Twigs from the album Magdalene